= Edward Wettin =

Edward Wettin may refer to:

- Edward VII of the United Kingdom (1841-1910), British monarch 1901-1910
- Edward VIII of the United Kingdom (1894-1972), British monarch, abdicated throne in 1936
